The XIX Corps of the Ottoman Empire (Turkish: 19 ncu Kolordu or On Dokuzuncu Kolordu) was one of the corps of the Ottoman Army. It was formed during World War I.

Formations

Order of Battle, August 1917, January 1918 
In August 1917, January 1918, the corps was structured as follows:

XIX Corps (Gallipoli)
59th Division

Order of Battle, June, September 1918 
In June, September 1918, the corps was structured as follows:

XIX Corps (Gallipoli)
None

Sources

Corps of the Ottoman Empire
Military units and formations of the Ottoman Empire in World War I